Nello Governato (14 September 1938 – 7 June 2019) was an Italian footballer who played for Torino, Como, Lazio, Lanerossi Vicenza and Savona.  He later worked as a director of sports at Lazio, Bologna, Juventus and Fiorentina.

References

1938 births
2019 deaths
Italian footballers
Association football midfielders
Serie A players
Serie B players
Serie C players
Torino F.C. players
Como 1907 players
S.S. Lazio players
L.R. Vicenza players
Savona F.B.C. players
S.S. Lazio non-playing staff
Bologna F.C. 1909 non-playing staff
Juventus F.C. non-playing staff
ACF Fiorentina non-playing staff